Pravin Hansraj (24 July 1938 – 28 January 2014) was an Indian cricketer. He played nine first-class matches for Saurashtra between 1963 and 1966.

His son Jugal Hansraj is a Bollywood film actor and director.

References

External links
 

1938 births
2014 deaths
Indian cricketers
Saurashtra cricketers
Cricketers from Karachi
Sindhi people